Trondheim og omland is an economic region in Trøndelag county, Norway. It consists of the municipalities of Trondheim, Rissa, Midtre Gauldal, Melhus, Skaun, Klæbu, Malvik, Selbu, Stjørdal and Tydal.  The center of the region is the city of Trondheim.

See also
 Trondheim Region
 Bergen og omland

Geography of Trondheim
Geography of Trøndelag